Craig Yacks (born March 14, 1976) is a retired American soccer player who spent most of his career in the USL A-League.

Youth
In 1994, Yacks graduated from Anderson High School where he was a 1994 Parade Magazine High School All American soccer player.  He attended Yale University where he played on the men’s soccer team from 1994 to 1997.  He holds the Yale single season assists record (set as a senior) and is third on the Yale career assists list.  He graduated in 1998.

Professional
In 1997, Yacks began playing for the expansion Cincinnati Riverhawks of the USISL.  Yacks and many of his team mates had grown up together playing for the Team Cincinnati youth club.  In July 1998, the Columbus Crew called Yacks up for a game against the Dallas Burn.  He did not enter the game.  On February 7, 1999, the Crew selected Yacks with the last pick (thirty-third overall) in the 1999 MLS Supplemental Draft.  The Crew released him during the pre-season and he returned to the Riverhawks.  In 2000, Yacks moved to the El Paso Patriots.  He was injured during the season and lost the entire 2001 season.  In 2002, he returned to the Riverhawks where he played until 2003.  In 2004, he moved indoors with the Cincinnati Excite of the American Indoor Soccer League.

Other Pursuits
After retiring from professional soccer, Craig obtained his Master's Degree in Community Planning from the University of Cincinnati College of Design, Architecture, Art and Planning.

From 2011-2019, Craig was a Hospital Administrator for veterinary clinics and emergency and specialty animal hospitals.

Currently, Craig serves as the Director of Business Development for a network of businesses focusing on the roofing industry. These include, Armor Services, a nationwide property management company specializing in roofing, DIY Roofs, an online roof replacement process linking individual homeowners directly with suppliers and roofing crews, Capnail, free project management & CRM software for the small to midsize roofing companies and independent sales contractors, New Roof Estimate, which provides online roof estimates using satellite technology to generate multiple bids from local, licensed and certified roofing contractors online while allowing the customer to remain completely anonymous and My Roof IQ, a complete roofing guide for consumers for roof repair and roof replacement projects.

References

External links
 

Living people
American soccer players
American Indoor Soccer League players
Cincinnati Excite players
Cincinnati Riverhawks players
Columbus Crew players
El Paso Patriots players
A-League (1995–2004) players
USISL players
Yale Bulldogs men's soccer players
1976 births
Soccer players from Ohio
Columbus Crew draft picks
Association football forwards
Association football midfielders